Fatehapur Narayan is a village at the border of Meerut district of Uttar Pradesh. It has two intermediate colleges. The total population of the village is 3442 and number of houses are 551. Female population is 47.0% and the literacy rate of village is 93.2%. The female literacy rate is 94.2%.ther are a tample who made jeeto jatnee and chajju singh jatt ln 1931

Location and Administration
The name of Fatehpur Narain village gram panchayat is Fatehpur Narayan. Its distance from sub district headquarter Mawana is 33 km and from headquarter Meerut is 31 km. Nearest town is Kithor at a distance of 6 km.

Education
There are primary and secondary private and government schools in the village. It also has a government degree college.

Agriculture

Sugarcane, paddy, mangoes and wheat are main agricultural commodities grown in this village. Gur handicraft items are also created here. The village gets 6 hours of agricultural power supply in summers and 8 hours of agricultural power supply in winters. Total irrigated area here is 485.9 hectares. Canals contribute to 116.12 hectares and tube wells support 369.78 hectares of land.

Water and Sanitation

Treated tap water and hand pump are used to supply the drinking water.

Communication
The village has a sub post office, landline telephone and mobile phone network facilities. The nearest private courier facility is at 5 kms from the village.

Transportation
Animal driven carts, auto rickshaw and cycle rickshaw are the main transport facilities available in the village. The nearest bus and train services are located at 5 kms.

References

Villages in Meerut district